Mark R. Morris (born 1947) is an American astrophysicist. He earned his B.A. magna cum laude at the University of California, Riverside and his Ph.D. in Physics at the University of Chicago. He did his postdoctoral work at the Owens Valley Radio Observatory, California Institute of Technology, and was on the faculty of the Department of Physics at Columbia University. Since 1985 he has been a professor in the Department of Physics and Astronomy at the University of California, Los Angeles. 

He is a founding member and Associate Director of the UCLA Galactic Center Group along with Eric Becklin and Andrea Ghez. The UCLA Galactic Center group uses images from the Keck Observatory to map the orbits of stars bound to the Milky Way's supermassive black hole, enabling a test of general relativity. Morris received the UCLA Distinguished Teaching Award in 2004.

Morris has worked extensively on multiwavelength studies of the Galactic Center, including a review article and he was co-discoverer of the extensive radio arcs present there. He continues to study high energy phenomena in the Galactic Center, including an X-ray fountain, radio structures connected to the central black hole Sgr A*, and star formation, including the detection of one of the most luminous stars in the Milky Way.  

His early work included landmark theoretical and observational studies of mass loss in the advanced stages of evolution of red giant stars, including examples of spectacular mass loss in red giants.

References

External links 

 Mark Morris at UCLA Physics & Astronomy

1947 births
20th-century  American astronomers
21st-century  American astronomers
American astrophysicists
University of California, Riverside alumni
Scientists from California
University of California, Los Angeles faculty
Living people